Ruska Bela is a village in northwestern Bulgaria, part of Mezdra Municipality, Vratsa Province. 

Villages in Vratsa Province